Kelly J. Roberts is an American businesswoman and philanthropist in Southern California.

She is the Vice Chairman and Chief Operating Officer of The Mission Inn Hotel & Spa, the historic landmark hotel in downtown Riverside, California, which she owns with her husband Duane Roberts. She is also the President of Casey's Cupcakes and KRR Enterprises.

Business ventures

Entrepreneurial Corporate Group
Roberts has developed and leads various business units within the Roberts family enterprise, Entrepreneurial Corporate Group (ECG), where she serves as owner and Vice Chairman.

The Mission Inn Hotel & Spa

The Roberts purchased The Mission Inn in 1992, saving the historic landmark hotel in downtown Riverside, California from demolition. As owner, Vice Chairman, and Chief Operating Officer of the hotel, Roberts oversees its daily operations and is responsible for expanding the property's dining options, spa facilities, and event roster, including launching annual celebrations such as the popular "Festival of Lights" held during the holiday season. Kelly's Spa, The Mission Inn's spa, bears Roberts name in recognition of her vision and leadership in developing the Tuscan-inspired 7,000 square foot facility featuring 12 treatment rooms.

Casey's Cupcakes
With her daughter Casey Brown, Roberts co-owns Casey's Cupcakes, a chain of boutique cupcake stores which won the Food Network's reality competition series Cupcake Wars in 2011. Roberts also serves as the company's president, overseeing the branding, public relations, marketing, and overall operations of the business. The first Casey's Cupcakes location opened in The Mission Inn in 2009.

KRR Enterprises
Roberts is owner and President of KRR Enterprises, provider of botanical anti-aging products and hotel guest room amenities.

Irvine & Roberts Family Vineyards
Roberts is an owner of Irvine & Roberts Family Vineyards in Ashland, Oregon, which produces Pinot noir and Chardonnay wine.

Philanthropy and community service
Roberts is on the Board of Directors and Life Associate of Pepperdine University, where she and her husband endowed the first Dean's chair of the Pepperdine University School of Law in 2007. Additionally, Roberts is on the board of directors of the Loma Linda University Children's Hospital Foundation and the Mission Inn Foundation, as well as on the Board of Trustees of the Fox Riverside Theatre Foundation. With her husband, she co-founded the Mary S. Roberts Foundation, which helps children with special needs, families of crime victims, the homeless, and the hungry. She then established the Kelly J. Roberts Foundation, which supports the Wounded Warrior Project and other causes.

Political activities
Roberts served on Team California, which raises funds for Republican causes. She participated in major fundraising campaigns for President Donald Trump, President George W. Bush, Governor Arnold Schwarzenegger, Governor Pete Wilson, Congressman Ken Calvert, Senator Ray Haynes, and District Attorney Grover Trask. In 2006, Governor Schwarzenegger appointed her to the California Council on Criminal Justice. She was a founding member of the Board of Directors of the Lincoln Club of Riverside County.  Kelly was recently appointed to the board of the John F. Kennedy Center for the Performing Arts in Washington D.C.  The Kennedy Center board has 36 members appointed by the President and 21 designated by Congress.

Personal life
Roberts is a native of Southern California. She grew up in Huntington Harbor and Palos Verdes. She earned a bachelor's degree from the University of Southern California (USC) and later earned a law degree.

Kelly wrote the children's book Baseball Boy about her son Doug's journey to becoming a professional baseball player. Roberts also wrote the book Kensington Kelly and the Mystery of the Missing Macaw: A Tale of the Mission Inn Hotel & Spa, a children’s story set at the Mission Inn featuring a character named after her granddaughter.

References

Living people
Businesspeople from California
Philanthropists from California
American women philanthropists
University of Southern California alumni
Year of birth missing (living people)